The 2013 Yemeni League is the 21st edition of top level football in Yemen.

The season started on February 28 and finished on 8 July, played in one calendar year rather than the previous editions which have been played over two calendar years.

Teams
Shabab Al Baydaa, Al Sha'ab Sana'a, Al-Ahli Taizz and Najm Sba were relegated to the second tier after finishing in the bottom four places of the 2011–12 Yemeni League season. They were replaced by Al-Wahda San'a', Al Yarmuk Al Rawda, Al-Saqr and Al Rasheed Ta'izz. Al Rasheed and Al Saqr are back after withdrawing from the 2010–11 League campaign. Al-Wahda San'a' are back after one season out of the top flight and Al Yarmuk return, last being in the top flight back in the 2009–10 league season.

Stadia and locations

Al Oruba appear to represent the small town of Zabid, but play all games in San'a'.

League standings

References 
RSSSF info page

Yemeni League seasons
Yem
Yem
1
1